Rodney Terry Latham (born 12 June 1961) is a former New Zealand cricketer. He played domestic cricket for Canterbury, and played four Tests and 33 One Day Internationals for New Zealand. He also played rugby union for Canterbury. He was born in Christchurch.  

He was an all rounder whose bowling style suited mostly to one-day cricket. He opened for New Zealand in the 1992 World Cup tournament. Latham played in four Test matches, scoring his only century (119) against Zimbabwe at Bulawayo in 1992.

Latham's son Tom Latham has played cricket for New Zealand in all forms of the game.

International career
Latham made his international debut on 1 December 1990 when he played against England in Adelaide as part of the tri-nation series which featured Australia. On debut, he scored 27 runs which featured two fours in his short innings. This was followed by a 36* against Australia at the same venue the following day. After getting out early in his next three matches, he contributed a strong hitting 38 from 44 balls against Australia in Bellerive Oval to help New Zealand reach 194 and later win the match.

Latham made his test debut on the 6 February 1992 against England in Wellington after New Zealand was reduced to three front-line seamers after an injury to fellow player Willie Watson meant that New Zealand had no suitable replacements. On his test debut, he would score 25 runs as the match was drawn. He was later selected to be part of the New Zealand ODI squad where he recorded figures of 3/25 from his eight overs in the second ODI against England in Dunedin.

After being selected for the 1992 Cricket World Cup, Latham scored 136 runs from seven innings which included his highest ODI score of 60 against South Africa on the 29 February 1992 in Auckland as he aided in a 114-run opening partnership to get the victory. In October 1992, he was selected to be a part of the tour of Zimbabwe where he scored his only international century in the first test, top scoring with 115 in the first innings as New Zealand won the series 1-0 before the ODI series went 2–0 in favor of New Zealand. He would play his last test match at the start of 1993 with Latham only scoring two runs in a defeat to Pakistan at Hamilton.

In the last ODI of the 1993 Australian series, he recorded his only five-wicket haul in international cricket when he took 5/32 from his ten overs in a three-run defeat which saw Australia win the series 3–2. His last international tour would be the tri-nation series in Australia where he only scored 68 runs from his six matches.

References

External links
 Rod Latham | Rugby Database Profile

New Zealand cricketers
1961 births
Living people
New Zealand Test cricketers
New Zealand One Day International cricketers
Cricketers at the 1992 Cricket World Cup
Canterbury cricketers
People educated at Linwood College
South Island cricketers